This article contains titles of books in the Thoroughbred series, a children's novel series created by Joanna Campbell, as well as a spin-off series and other related books.

The Thoroughbred Series

Original Series 
 A Horse Called Wonder
 Wonder's Promise
 Wonder's First Race
 Wonder's Victory
 Ashleigh's Dream
 Wonder's Yearling
 Samantha's Pride
 Sierra's Steeplechase
 Pride's Challenge
 Pride's Last Race
 Wonder's Sister
 Shining's Orphan
 Cindy's Runaway Colt
 Cindy's Glory
 Glory's Triumph
 Glory In Danger
 Ashleigh's Farewell
 Glory's Rival
 Cindy's Heartbreak
 Champion's Spirit
 Wonder's Champion
 Arabian Challenge
 Cindy's Honor
 The Horse Of Her Dreams
 Melanie's Treasure
 Sterling's Second Chance
 Christina's Courage
 Camp Saddlebrook
 Melanie's Last Ride
 Dylan's Choice
 A Home For Melanie
 Cassidy's Secret
 Racing Parker
 On The Track
 Dead Heat
 Without Wonder
 Star In Danger
 Down To The Wire
 Living Legend
 Ultimate Risk
 Close Call
 The Bad Luck Filly
 Fallen Star
 Perfect Image
 Star's Chance
 Racing Image
 Cindy's Desert Adventure (1st Lost Diary Special)
 Cindy's Bold Start (2nd Lost Diary Special)
 Rising Star
 Team Player
 Distance Runner
 Perfect Challenge
 Derby Fever
 Cindy's Last Hope
 Great Expectations
 Hoofprints In The Snow
 Faith In A Longshot
 Christina's Shining Star
 Star's Inspiration
 Taking The Reins
 Parker's Passion
 Unbridled Fury
 Starstruck
 The Price Of Fame
 Bridal Dreams
 Samantha's Irish Luck
 Breaking The Fall
 Kaitlin's Wild Ride
 Melanie's Double Jinx
 Allie's Legacy
 Calamity Jinx
 Legacy's Gift

Super Editions 
 Ashleigh's Christmas Miracle
 Ashleigh's Diary
 Ashleigh's Hope
 Samantha's Journey

Other Special Titles

Cindy's Lost Diaries
While not Super Edition books, #47 Cindy's Desert Adventure and  #48 Cindy's Bold Start are two "lost diary specials" published within the regular series in an attempt to explain the missing characters and continuity problems created by the ten-year gap which occurred between Cindy's Honor and the New Generation books. These books detail how Ashleigh miscarried her second pregnancy, the fate of Wonder's Champion, and Cindy McLean's travels to the United Arab Emirates, New York City, and finally back to Whitebrook Farm.

Samantha's Arc
Similar to the "lost diary specials", Samantha also had a two book special #65 Bridal Dreams and #66 Samantha's Irish Luck which were  published within the regular series. These books are not distinguished with a separate title indicating their "special" status within the series, but are generally regarded as such and were included within the regular series also in attempts to explain Samantha's story during the ten-year gap created by the New Generation books. The books detail Samantha's marriage to Tor and their subsequent relocation to Ireland, Samantha's shifting focus from horse racing to eventing and show jumping, and the birth of Samantha and Tor's children.

The Ashleigh Series 
The spin-off series, Ashleigh, is 'supposedly' set in between Ashleigh's Hope and Ashleigh's Diary. However, this spin-off presents some major inconsistencies. In #2 Wonder's Promise (original series), Ashleigh states she's never attended a live horse race before; however, in the Ashleigh series (and Ashleigh's Diary, the Super Edition), she attends several races. This leads to the other error/inconsistency. In #7 Derby Day (Ashleigh series), it is said that Rhoda Kat is the first female jockey to win the Kentucky Derby. However, in the original series, Jilly Gordon clearly is. When the plague hits Ashleigh's family, various horses who survive or are sold before the first book, die (Midnight Wanderer, for example, who is put to sleep in the book, 'Goodbye Midnight Wanderer', apparently dies of the mysterious plague, rather than from the accident.) There is also large changes as to how Ashleigh and Mona get their horses. Ashleigh meets Stardust in Ashleigh's Hope and then owns (and must sell her) in Ashleigh's Diary, but in the Ashleigh Series she gets Stardust in #3 Waiting for Stardust and Stardust is expecting a foal in #15 Stardust's Foal (which this in never mentioned in Ashleigh's Hope or Ashleigh's Diary). In Ashleigh's Hope Mona gets a Thoroughbred she names Frisky on Thanksgiving Day, rubs it in, won't let Ashleigh ride Frisky, and the girls have a big fight. But in the Ashleigh Series Mona gets a Thoroughbred for Christmas, names her Frisky like she and Ashleigh had planned, says she is sorry and is not trying to rub it in as soon as she tells Ashleigh, and asks her to come over tomorrow to ride Frisky. The entire Ashleigh series is in a sort of "time bubble" and none of the events really line up with the events in the other Thoroughbred books, so it is almost a stand alone series in and of itself.

 Lightning's Last Hope
 A Horse For Christmas
 Waiting For Stardust
 Good-Bye Midnight Wanderer
 The Forbidden Stallion
 A Dangerous Ride
 Derby Day
 The Lost Foal
 Holiday Homecoming
 Derby Dreams
 Ashleigh's Promise
 Winter Race Camp
 The Prize
 Ashleigh's Western Challenge
 Stardust's Foal

The Ashleigh Collection 
Ashleigh's Thoroughbred Collection contains three stand alone books that do not tie into/effect the storylines of the other series. Battlecry Forever! is a slight exception though. It is about Battlecry (the sire of Fleet Goddess, a filly that Ashleigh Griffen purchases in #5 Ashleigh's Dream of the Thoroughbred series) but it is considered stand alone (due to not playing a major role in the storyline of Thoroughbred), even though it is also still technically considered the only book written outside of the Thoroughbred series that is canon.

 Battlecry, Forever!
 Star of Shadowbrook Farm
 The Forgotten Filly
Thoroughbred